The 1914 Villanova Wildcats football team represented the Villanova University during the 1914 college football season. The Wildcats team captain was Frank Prendergast.

Schedule

References

Villanova
Villanova Wildcats football seasons
Villanova Wildcats football